The Kınalı-Tekirdağ-Çanakkale-Balıkesir Motorway is a planned  motorway, with an  section between Malkara and Çanakkale under construction. When complete, the route will begin at Malkara, travel south to Çanakkale, cross the Dardanelles via the Çanakkale 1915 Bridge, and terminate at Balikesir; connecting western Anatolia with East Thrace. The route will be the first motorway in Turkey outside of Istanbul to connect the European and the Asian parts of the country.

Construction started on 18 March 2017 in Çanakkale, on the 102nd anniversary of the Turkish naval victory during the Dardanelles Campaign of World War I. The Malkara-Lapseki section (~90 km), including the Çanakkale 1915 Bridge, was opened on March 18, 2022.

Route

References

Buildings and structures in Çanakkale Province
Gelibolu District
Lapseki District
Dardanelles
Motorways in Turkey
Transport in Istanbul Province
Transport in Tekirdağ Province
Transport in Çanakkale Province
Transport in Balıkesir Province
Toll roads in Turkey